Todtnau is a town in the district of Lörrach in Baden-Württemberg, Germany. As of 2009 its population was of 4,932.

Geography
It is situated in the Black Forest, on the river Wiese, 20 km southeast of Freiburg.

The municipality counts 8 civil parishes (Ortsteil):
 Aftersteg 
 Brandenberg
 Geschwend
 Herrenschwand
 Muggenbrunn
 Präg
 Schlechtnau
 Todtnauberg

Personalities
Karl Nessler, inventor of the permanent wave was born here.
Martin Heidegger had a chalet in Todtnauberg

Photogallery

References

External links

 www.todtnau.de Todtnau official website
 Information about and images

Towns in Baden-Württemberg
Lörrach (district)
Baden